General elections were held in Gibraltar in May 1996. They were won by Peter Caruana's Gibraltar Social Democrats (GSD), who took over 50% of the popular vote and eight of the 15 contested seats, defeating incumbent Joe Bossano's Gibraltar Socialist Labour Party.

Results

By candidate
The first fifteen candidates were elected to the House of Assembly.

References

General elections in Gibraltar
Gibraltar
General
Gibraltar
Election and referendum articles with incomplete results